The Guam national baseball team is the national baseball team of Guam. The team represents Guam in international competitions. Guam has competed in the Asian Baseball Championship.

Asian Baseball Championship

Guam have competed in the Asian Baseball Championship, and in  finished 4th.

Medal Earnings
  :  1st (2003 South Pacific Games)
  :  1st (2005 Mini South Pacific Games)
  :  2nd (2011 South Pacific Games)
  :  1st (Micronesian Games, Pohnpei, FSM)

National baseball teams
Baseball
National